Senator Wham may refer to:

Dottie Wham (1925–2019), Colorado State Senate
Robert Wham (1926–2011), Colorado State Senate